Where I Stand is the eleventh studio album by Christian singer-songwriter Twila Paris released on April 2, 1996. After being on Star Song Records for more than ten years, Paris signed on with sister label Sparrow Records starting with this release. The album debuted and peaked at number 87 on the Top 200 Albums chart, marking Paris' first time on that chart and number 3 on the Top Christian Albums chart in Billboard magazine. The album's first single "Faithful Friend" is a duet with singer-songwriter (and Sparrow labelmate) Steven Curtis Chapman, which they wrote together and placed in the top 5 on Christian radio and Paris' second single "(I Am) Not Afraid Anymore" reached number 1 on the Christian AC chart.

Track listing 
All songs written by Twila Paris, except where noted.

Personnel 
 Twila Paris – lead vocals, backing vocals (2)
 Shane Keister – keyboards (1-5, 7-10), acoustic piano (11)
 Blair Masters – programming (6), additional keyboards (10)
 Brian Hughes – electric guitar (1), bouzouki (1), oud (1), acoustic guitar (6)
 Jerry McPherson – electric guitar (1, 2, 4, 5, 7, 9, 10)
 Don Potter – acoustic guitar (1-4, 8, 9, 10)
 Dann Huff – electric guitar (3, 8)
 Gordon Kennedy – electric guitar (3, 5, 7)
 Darrell Scott – acoustic guitar (5, 7)
 Mike Brignardello – bass (1, 2, 3, 8, 9, 10)
 David Hungate – bass (4, 5, 7)
 Steve Brewster – drums (1, 2, 3, 5, 7-10)
 Paul Leim – drums (4)
 David Hamilton – string arrangements (2)
 Jeremy Lubbock – string arrangements (4)
 Conni Ellisor – string arrangements (8)
 Ronn Huff – string arrangements (11)
 Gavyn Wright – concertmaster (2, 4, 8)
 The London Session Orchestra – strings (2, 4, 8)
 John Catchings – cello (11)
 Bob Mason – cello (11)
 Carole Rabinowitz – cello (11)
 Kristin Wilkinson – viola (11)
 Chris Eaton – backing vocals (1, 2, 5, 6, 7, 9, 10)
 Diana DeWitt – backing vocals (1, 3, 7)
 Michael Mellett – backing vocals (1, 2, 3, 6, 7, 9, 10)
 Lisa Bevill – backing vocals (2, 3)
 Chris Rodriguez – backing vocals (2, 3, 9, 10)
 Nicol Smith – backing vocals (2, 3)
 Micah Wilshire – backing vocals (3)
 Steven Curtis Chapman – lead vocals (4)
 Tabitha Fair – backing vocals (9)
 Kim Fleming – backing vocals (9)
 Lisa Keith – backing vocals (10)

Production
 Peter York – executive producer 
 Brown Bannister – producer 
 Steve Bishir – recording 
 Rupert Coulson – string recording 
 David Thoener – mixing 
 Gary Paczosa – additional engineer 
 Carl Meadows – assistant engineer, mix assistant 
 Hank Nirider – assistant engineer 
 Martin Woodlee – assistant engineer 
 Doug Sax – mastering at The Mastering Lab (Hollywood, California)
 Traci Sterling Bishir – production coordinator 
 Karen Philpott – art direction 
 Torne White – design 
 Andrew Eccles – photography 
 E.J. Carr – photography

Critical reception 

Rodney Batdorf of AllMusic has said that Paris "continues to become more pop-oriented with each of her releases, but that's not necessarily a bad thing. Although 'Where I Stand' could be mistaken for any number of records cluttering the adult contemporary radio stations, Paris performs with style and grace, which is what saves the album from being either a sell-out or a wash-out."

Jayne Butler of Cross Rhythms said that "'Where I Stand' has a lot to live up to, but this collection of pop songs and ballads more than meets its expectations. From the first bars of 'Love's Been Following You' to the end of 'I Will Listen,' we are reminded that Twila has been blessed with a wonderful gift of singing and song writing. Overall the sound has been toned down a little from her last album, but there are many potential hits, including 'Faithful Friend,' an impressive duet with Steven Curtis Chapman and 'What Did He Die For?'" Butler also said that the "combination of beautiful songs, an amazing voice, talented musicians and Brown Bannister's production skills make this an outstanding album, not only to be enjoyed, but also to challenge and inspire."

Charts

Radio singles

References 

1996 albums
Twila Paris albums
Sparrow Records albums
Albums produced by Brown Bannister